Best Intentions may refer to:

The Best Intentions, 1992 Swedish film
Best Intentions (album), by American rock band We Are the In Crowd 2011
"Best Intentions", Russell Hitchcock from self-titled album 1988
"Best Intentions", The Tyde from Twice
"Best Intentions", Robbie Williams from The Heavy Entertainment Show 2016
"Best Intentions" (Les Bonnes Intentions), 2018 French film by Gilles Legrand